At the 2006 Winter Paralympics, 12 biathlon events were contested at Pragelato.

Medal table

Events

Men
 12.5 km 
 Sitting
 Standing
 Visually impaired
 7.5 km 
 Sitting
 Standing
 Visually impaired

Women
 10 km 
 Sitting
 12.5 km 
 Standing
 Visually impaired
 7.5 km 
 Sitting
 Standing
 Visually impaired

Men's events

Men's 7.5km

Men's 12.5km

Women's events

Women's 7.5km

Women's 10km

Women's 12.5km

See also
Biathlon at the 2006 Winter Olympics

References

Medallists - Torino 2006 Paralympic Winter Games - Biathlon, Official Website of the Paralympic Movement

 
2006 Winter Paralympics events
2006
Paralympics
Biathlon competitions in Italy